Roger Federer was the defending champion but did not compete that year.

Dominik Hrbatý won in the final 4–6, 6–4, 6–4 against Robin Söderling.

Seeds

  Juan Carlos Ferrero (first round)
  Guillermo Coria (second round)
  Paradorn Srichaphan (first round)
  Max Mirnyi (quarterfinals)
  Fernando González (quarterfinals)
  Albert Costa (second round)
  Arnaud Clément (semifinals)
  Marat Safin (second round)

Draw

Finals

Top half

Bottom half

External links
 2004 Open 13 Singles draw

Open 13
2004 ATP Tour